The 2022 AON Open Challenger was a professional tennis tournament played on clay courts. It was the eighteenth edition of the tournament which was part of the 2022 ATP Challenger Tour. It took place in Genoa, Italy between 19 and 25 September 2022.

Singles main-draw entrants

Seeds

 1 Rankings are as of 12 September 2022.

Other entrants
The following players received wildcards into the singles main draw:
  Federico Arnaboldi
  Gianmarco Ferrari
  Albert Ramos Viñolas

The following player received entry into the singles main draw using a protected ranking:
  Sebastian Ofner

The following players received entry into the singles main draw as alternates:
  Adrian Andreev
  Lukas Neumayer

The following players received entry from the qualifying draw:
  Andrey Chepelev
  Matteo Gigante
  Sandro Kopp
  Martin Krumich
  Matteo Martineau
  Gabriele Piraino

The following player received entry as a lucky loser:
  Oscar José Gutierrez

Champions

Singles

  Thiago Monteiro def.  Andrea Pellegrino 6–1, 7–6(7–2).

Doubles

  Dustin Brown /  Andrea Vavassori def.  Roman Jebavý /  Adam Pavlásek 6–2, 6–2.

References

AON Open Challenger
2022
2022 in Italian tennis
September 2022 sports events in Italy